Miriam Mahdaviani is a choreographer, a former New York City Ballet dancer and a repetiteur for the George Balanchine Trust. She has created ballets for NYCB's 1988 American Music Festival and its Diamond Project in 1992, 1994,1997, 2000 and 2002. She also choreographed ballets for Pacific Northwest Ballet, Richmond Ballet, Jacob's Pillow, Vassar College, NYU Tisch School of the Arts, SUNY Purchase, and others. Internationally, her ballets have been presented at MaggioDanza in Florence, Italy and at the Edinburg Festival in Scotland.

Mahdaviani married Eric Goldstone on October 9, 1988, and has two daughters, Carolyn and Elizabeth.

Ballets 

1988 The Newcomers
1991 Dance Preludes
1992 Images
1994 Correlazione
1997 Urban Dances
2000 Appalachia Waltz
2002 In the Mi(d)st

Reviews 

June 25, 2002 Anna Kisselgoff, NY Times
June 29, 1997 Anna Kisselgoff, NY Times
December 2, 1990 Jennifer Dunning, NY Times
May 1, 1985 Anna Kisselgoff, NY Times
November 26, 1983 Jack Anderson, NY Times
January 31, 1982 Anna Kisselgoff, NY Times

Articles 

June 2000 Wendy Perron, Dance Magazine
May 15, 1994 Jennifer Dunning, NY Times
August 16, 1987 Jennifer Dunning, NY Times

New York City Ballet dancers
Ballet choreographers
Balanchine Trust repetiteurs
Ballet mistresses
New York City Ballet Diamond Project choreographers
Mae L. Wien Young Choreographer Award recipients
Living people
Vassar College
New York University people
 Miriam Mahdaviani
Year of birth missing (living people)